The Legend of Spyro: A New Beginning is a 2006 action-adventure video game action-adventure video game in the Spyro series. It is the first installment in The Legend of Spyro trilogy. The game was released for the Game Boy Advance, Nintendo DS, GameCube, PlayStation 2, Xbox, and mobile.

It features the voice talents of Elijah Wood as Spyro, Gary Oldman as Ignitus, David Spade as Sparx, and Cree Summer as Cynder.

The game was followed by The Legend of Spyro: The Eternal Night in 2007.

 Gameplay A New Beginning uses a more action-based focus than previous Spyro games. Rather than the previous focus on platforming, the gameplay is now more combat based. Spyro has a variety of combat moves as well as four different breath attacks: fire, electricity, ice and earth, which he can use as both long range and short range attacks. Spyro can also use furies, huge blasts of elemental energy. The game has fewer levels than previous Spyro games, with six levels that progress from a starting point towards a final destination and boss encounter in a linear fashion, and two rail shooter style flying levels adjoining them. It takes about six hours to complete the game.

The DS version has additional attacks and challenges. As well as breath attacks and furies, Spyro can create an elemental shield around himself that protects him from enemies while hurting attacking enemies. Also, the DS version has extra side missions in the form of puzzles.

 Plot 
The game begins inside a temple, where an enormous red dragon named Ignitus is watching over an egg; it is the "Year of the Dragon" (not to be confused with the third Spyro game), a time every twelve years when new dragon eggs are brought to the realm. A dragons' prophecy tells that a rare purple dragon will be born every ten generations, which will direct that era's fate; Ignitus is looking after such an egg.

The dragons are, however, at war with an enemy known as the "Dark Master," who also knows of the prophecy, and lays siege to the temple, intent on destroying the brood of eggs. Ignitus escapes with the purple dragon's egg, leaving it to drift downriver into a swamp, hoping for the best. A family of dragonflies discovers the egg, and upon hatching, they name the dragon Spyro, adopt him into the family, and raise him as one of their own alongside Sparx, a dragonfly born the same day.

One day, after coming under attack by strange foes and discovering that he can breathe fire, Spyro is told that he is not a dragonfly himself but a stranger from a distant land; Spyro decides to leave the swamp in search of his true home; Sparx, though reluctant at first, decides to follow along. Hostile forces pursue Spyro, but eventually come into contact with a distraught Ignitus, who, although pleased that Spyro is alive, fears that with the Dragon Temple under occupation by their enemy, led by a black female dragon named Cynder, their war is already lost.

Spyro convinces Ignitus to lead him to the Temple and is able to drive Cynder's forces out, after which Ignitus tells Spyro more about their war against the dark armies, offers Spyro some training in the art of the fire element, and then sends Spyro off to rescue three other dragons from Cynder's forces. One by one, Spyro clashes with Cynder's armies and saves the three other dragons, Volteer, Cyril, and Terrador, while gaining powers over electricity, ice, and earth, as well as acquiring new skills and training along the way. He also runs into new friends, such as Kane and the Atlawas on Tall Plains, and Mole-Yair, Exhumor, and The Manweersmalls on Munitious Forge, respectively. It is learned that Cynder has been draining the dragons' power into crystals.

Cynder, however, starts fighting Spyro after rescuing Terrador; Ignitus intervenes to fight Cynder but is captured. It is revealed that the four dragons originally sealed away the Dark Master and that Cynder is using the dragons' drained powers to open the seal. Ignitus's power is the final key in unsealing the Dark Master, so Spyro is sent on a final, direct assault against Cynder's fortress.

Spyro attempts to fight Cynder, but Cynder succeeds in draining Ignitus's power of fire into a crystal and escapes to the sealed realm of the Dark Master. During the fight, Spyro noticed something familiar in Cynder's eyes. Ignitus then tells Spyro the rest of the story of what happened the night of the attack on the temple. After sending Spyro's egg down the river, Ignitus had returned to see that the Dark Master's forces had destroyed the brood of eggs, except one - for only a dragon born in the Year of the Dragon can open the portal and release the Dark Master: Cynder, who had been stolen and was cursed by the Dark Master's sinister powers. Ignitus fears that it is too late to stop her. Still, Spyro pursues Cynder and forces a showdown, eventually using all of his power in a final attack that defeats her, purging her of the Dark Master's influence and returning her to her proper form, a young female dragon the same size and age as Spyro. The realm begins to collapse in on itself; Sparx insists on making a quick exit, but Spyro declares he will not leave Cynder behind with the Dark Master because he had cursed her and she was not acting on her own choice. Spyro is barely able to grab Cynder and escape safely.

Though victorious, the battle cost Spyro much of his strength and powers, and both Spyro and Cynder suspect that the Dark Master is still alive somewhere; the war is still far from over. The story continues in The Legend of Spyro: The Eternal Night.

 Development 

Krome Studios were asked by Vivendi Games to develop The Legend of Spyro. After Krome showed Vivendi their technology they were using to develop a Crash Bandicoot game, Sierra asked a prototype for what subsequently became The Legend of Spyro.

The game utilizes the voices of actors, featuring Elijah Wood as the voice of Spyro, Comedian David Spade as Sparx, Cree Summer as Cynder and Gary Oldman as Ignitus.

 Reception 

The game received "mixed or average" reviews on all platforms except the Game Boy Advance version, which received "generally unfavorable" reviews, according to the review aggregation website Metacritic.IGN stated, "The franchise has gotten a serious lift in nearly every area. The overall gameplay was extremely solid for a children's title, the overall presentation was baffling complex – with everything from scripted story events and innovative enemy entrances – and the overall audio/graphical design is definitely stronger than we expected." Eurogamer stated, "If you loved the original games then that might carry you through to completion but for those who are new, prepare for a long slog."

 Sequel 
Its success spawned two sequels, The Legend of Spyro: The Eternal Night and The Legend of Spyro: Dawn of the Dragon''. A CGI movie adaptation was rumored to be in the works ahead of its release.

Note

References

External links 

 
 
 
 

2006 video games
3D platform games
Action-adventure games
Game Boy Advance games
GameCube games
Krome Studios games
Mobile games
Nintendo DS games
PlayStation 2 games
Sierra Entertainment games
Single-player video games
Spyro the Dragon video games
Universal Interactive games
Video games about size change
Video game reboots
Video games developed in Australia
Xbox games
Xbox Originals games
Video games developed in the United States
Amaze Entertainment games

de:Spyro#The Legend of Spyro: A New Beginning
es:La Leyenda De Spyro: Un Nuevo Comienzo
nl:De Legende van Spyro